Kach may refer to:

Places
 Kach, Iran (disambiguation)
 Kach, Pakistan, a town in Pakistan
 Kach Banda, a town in Hangu District, Pakistan
 Kach Gandava, a region of Balochistan, Pakistan

Other
 Wade Kach, American politician
 Kach (political party), a banned far-right political party in Israel